José Fernando de Aguiar Júnior or simply Fernando Aguiar (born November 17, 1991 in Porto Alegre), is a Brazilian defensive midfielder. He currently plays for São Bernardo.

References

External links

1991 births
Living people
Brazilian footballers
Campeonato Brasileiro Série A players
Campeonato Brasileiro Série B players
Campeonato Brasileiro Série D players
Sociedade Esportiva Palmeiras players
Associação Atlética Flamengo players
Boa Esporte Clube players
Clube Atlético Penapolense players
Associação Atlética Ponte Preta players
Mirassol Futebol Clube players
Paysandu Sport Club players
Oeste Futebol Clube players
Rio Claro Futebol Clube players
Barretos Esporte Clube players
Nacional Atlético Clube (SP) players
São Bernardo Futebol Clube players
Association football defenders
Footballers from Porto Alegre